The Zeppelin-Staaken R.VII was six-engined large bomber - a Riesenflugzeug - of Imperial Germany, intended to be less vulnerable than the airships in use at the time.

Development
The R.VII, an incremental improvement on the almost identical Zeppelin-Staaken R.IV, had two engine pods, each with tandem pusher engines, large enough for some inflight maintenance by flight mechanics housed in cockpits forward of the nacelle engines, driving the large pusher propellers through clutches, gearboxes, and shafts. A further two engines were mounted in the nose of the fuselage, driving a single tractor propeller in a similar fashion.

Operational history
First flown early in 1917, the sole R.VII (R.14/15) was accepted by the Deutsche Luftstreitkräfte (Imperial German Air Service) on 3 July 1917 and assigned to Rfa 501 on 29 July 1917. Used in operations on the Western Front, the R.VII had a short operational life, crashing due to a clutch failure and the incorrect actions of a flight mechanic, with the loss of six crew members.

Operators

Specifications (Zeppelin-Staaken R.VII)

Notes

References

A. K. Rohrbach, "Das 1000-PS Verkehrsflugzeug der Zeppelin-Werke, Staaken," Zeitschrift für Flugtechnik und Motorluftschiffahrt, vol. 12, no. 1 (15 January 1921)
E. Offermann, W. G. Noack, and A. R. Weyl, "Riesenflugzeuge", in: Handbuch der Flugzeugkunde (Richard Carl Schmidt & Co., 1927)

Zeppelin-Staaken
1910s German bomber aircraft
Military aircraft of World War I
Pusher aircraft
Aircraft first flown in 1917